Methanogenium boonei is a methanogenic archaean. Cells are non-motile irregular cocci 1.0-2.5 μm in diameter. This mesophile grows optimally at 19.4 °C, pH6.4-7.8, salinity 0.3-0.5M Na+. It was first isolated from Skan Bay, Alaska.

Description and metabolism
The cells are irregular and coccoid in shape, non-motile, approximately 1.0–2.5 μm in diameter. These mesophiles grow optimally at a temperature of 19.4 °C, pH 6.4–7.8 and salinity of 0.3–0.5 M Na+. This is a strictly anaerobic species, and individuals can use carbon dioxide with hydrogen or formate as substrates to produce methane.

References

External links
Type strain of Methanogenium boonei at BacDive -  the Bacterial Diversity Metadatabase

Euryarchaeota
Archaea described in 2007